John Alun Adolphus Herbert (born 20 April 1962) is an English former sportsperson, who represented Great Britain as both a triple jumper and a bobsledder. Competing in athletics, he won the gold medal for England in the triple jump at the 1986 Commonwealth Games in Edinburgh. He represented Great Britain at the 1984 Summer Olympics and 1988 Summer Olympics. He competed in the four-man bobsleigh event at the 1994 Winter Olympics (finishing in eighth place).

Since retired from sport he moved into art and media, working with broadcaster ITV and Art of the Olympians, among others.

He was born in Meadows, Nottingham.

Athletics career
Herbert competed in athletics as a triple jumper in the 1980s and 1990s. He qualified in two Summer Olympics, finishing 10th in 1984, failing to make the final in 1988. Herbert also represented Great Britain at the 1983 and 1991 World Championships in Athletics in Helsinki and Tokyo, but did not qualify for the final. In 1985 he won the European Cup in Moscow with a jump of 17'39". He also competed at two World Student Games finishing third at both Edmonton, Canada, 1983 and Kobe, Japan, 1985. Herbert also won numerous UK championships and AAA championships at both long jump and triple jump. He appeared at three Commonwealth Games; in addition to his gold medal in 1986 he also competed in the 1982 and 1990 Games.

Bobsleigh career
Herbert switched to bobsleigh in 1993. His best finish at the Winter Olympics was eighth in the four-man event at Lillehammer in 1994 together with Shaun Olson, Dean Ward and Paul Field. Herbert is the first black British athlete to compete in both Winter and Summer Olympics.

Coaching career
Herbert served as an athletics coach for the jumping events at the 1996, 2000, and 2004 Summer Olympics for Great Britain. He was coach to Olympic silver medallist  until 2008 and coached Jade Johnson until 2012.

Herbert was able to transfer his success in athletics into coaching. He is currently National Event coach for Jumps; he was also Great Britain U23 team manager until 2011. As a coach, John has mentored many outstanding British athletes including Phillips Idowu whom he coached from 1998 to 2008.

Film, Media and Art career
Herbert has worked for a multitude of media organisations including creative departments at the BBC and as Creative Director at Meridian Broadcasting, part of ITV Network. He now divides his time between philanthropic works and athletics coaching. He is a graduate of the Central School of Art and Design. In 2017, Herbert became involved with the Art of the Olympians.

References

 1983 IAAF World Championships in Athletics triple jump results
 1984 Summer Olympics athletics triple jump results
 1988 Summer Olympics athletics triple jump results
 1994 Winter Olympics bobsleigh four-man results
 British Olympic Association profile
 The Olympian Winter 2005 issue featuring Herbert

External links 
 

1962 births
Living people
Sportspeople from Nottingham
British male triathletes
English male triathletes
English male bobsledders
British male triple jumpers
English male triple jumpers
Olympic male triple jumpers
Olympic athletes of Great Britain
Athletes (track and field) at the 1984 Summer Olympics
Athletes (track and field) at the 1988 Summer Olympics
Olympic bobsledders of Great Britain
Bobsledders at the 1994 Winter Olympics
Commonwealth Games gold medallists for England
Commonwealth Games medallists in athletics
Athletes (track and field) at the 1982 Commonwealth Games
Athletes (track and field) at the 1986 Commonwealth Games
Athletes (track and field) at the 1990 Commonwealth Games
Universiade medalists in athletics (track and field)
Universiade bronze medalists for Great Britain
Medalists at the 1983 Summer Universiade
World Athletics Championships athletes for Japan
Japan Championships in Athletics winners
Medallists at the 1986 Commonwealth Games